is a Japanese monthly yonkoma seinen manga magazine published by Houbunsha since July 1982. The magazine celebrated its 30th anniversary in 2012.

Serialized titles
Komori-san wa Kotowarenai!

References

1982 establishments in Japan
Houbunsha magazines
Magazines established in 1982
Magazines published in Tokyo
Monthly manga magazines published in Japan
Seinen manga magazines
Yonkoma